Gustavo Moreno Ramos (born 2 August 1948) is a Mexican politician affiliated with the New Alliance Party. He served as Deputy of the LIX Legislature of the Mexican Congress representing Veracruz. He previously served as municipal president of Misantla from 1997 to 2000 and as a local deputy in the LIX Legislature of the Congress of Veracruz.

References

1948 births
Living people
Politicians from Veracruz
New Alliance Party (Mexico) politicians
20th-century Mexican politicians
21st-century Mexican politicians
Members of the Congress of Veracruz
Municipal presidents in Veracruz
People from Misantla
Deputies of the LIX Legislature of Mexico
Members of the Chamber of Deputies (Mexico) for Veracruz